Colemanite (Ca2B6O11·5H2O) or (CaB3O4(OH)3·H2O) is a borate mineral found in evaporite deposits of alkaline lacustrine environments. Colemanite is a secondary mineral that forms by alteration of borax and ulexite.

It was first described in 1884 for an occurrence near Furnace Creek in Death Valley and was named after William Tell Coleman (1824–1893), owner of the mine "Harmony Borax Works" where it was first found.  At the time, Coleman had alternatively proposed the name "smithite" instead after his business associate Francis Marion Smith.

Uses
Colemanite is an important ore of boron, and was the most important boron ore until the discovery of kernite in 1926. It has many industrial uses, like the manufacturing of heat resistant glass.

See also
List of minerals
List of minerals named after people

References

External links 

Inoborates
Ferroelectric materials
Monoclinic minerals
Minerals in space group 14
Luminescent minerals